Cloudsoft Monterey was platform as a service (PaaS) software developed by Cloudsoft Corp to provide Intelligent Application Mobility across multiple Cloud computing environments. It supported vCloud, Amazon EC2 and GoGrid as well as private clouds using the jclouds Cloud API. The application was written in Java using the Equinox OSGi framework with configuration DSLs written Groovy. The main components were an Eclipse based development studio tool and plugin for developers, a management console and the Monterey management and network nodes which run the mobile application logic

See also 
 Platform as a service

External links 
 Cloudsoft Corp Web Site

References 

Cloud applications